Hofstadter's law is a self-referential adage, coined by Douglas Hofstadter in his book Gödel, Escher, Bach: An Eternal Golden Braid (1979) to describe the widely experienced difficulty of accurately estimating the time it will take to complete tasks of substantial complexity:

The law is often cited by programmers in discussions of techniques to improve productivity, such as The Mythical Man-Month or extreme programming.

History
In 1979, Hofstadter introduced the law in connection with a discussion of chess-playing computers, which at the time were continually being beaten by top-level human players, despite outpacing humans in depth of analysis.  Hofstadter wrote:

In 1997, the chess computer Deep Blue became the first to beat a human champion by defeating Garry Kasparov.

See also

References

Adages
Self-reference
Paremiology